Barbalin may refer to:
 a synonym for aloin A, a constituent of aloin
 Barbalin, Western Australia, a place in Western Australia